The Hannover–Braunschweig–Göttingen–Wolfsburg Metropolitan Region (German: Metropolregion Hannover-Braunschweig-Göttingen-Wolfsburg) is an economic and cultural region in Northern Germany. The metropolitan area comprises approximately one third of the area of Lower Saxony, with almost half the inhabitants of the state. It has about 3.9 million people in 20 districts and counties with a total of 431 municipalities and is defined by the German Ministerkonferenz für Raumordnung (MKRO) as a medium urban area in Germany.

History
The application for recognition as a European metropolitan region with the German Ministerkonferenz für Raumordnung responsible for regional planning (MKRO) was made early. The recognition should help the region internationally and improve coordination and development of cities. Although the importance of the region and the developments relating to the citynetwork Expo 2000 she was still the smallest of the metropolitan regions. In 2005 a loose co-operation was initiated with the nearby city regions of Braunschweig and Salzgitter and up in the area of Göttingen.

Area description
Between the cities of the region there are large predominantly agricultural areas. The urban infrastructure network consist of the highways A2, A7 and A39 and fast rail links, in particular some high speed rail (like the Hanover–Würzburg high-speed railway).

The region is mainly based on the service sector and manufacturing. The largest group is the Volkswagen AG headquarters in Wolfsburg. The science and research landscape of the region includes seven universities (including the University of Göttingen, Leibniz University Hannover and the Braunschweig University of Technology), nine colleges, an art college, a music and theater school, and approximately 60 other research institutions (including a large number of Max Planck Society Institutes, two locations of the German Aerospace Center (DLR) in Braunschweig and Göttingen, the Herzog August Bibliothek in Wolfenbüttel and various federal agencies such as BBA, BGR, FAL, PTB).

Radioactive waste is frequently transported in the area to the city of Salzgitter, for the deep geological repository Schacht Konrad and between Schacht Asse II in the Wolfenbüttel district and Lindwedel and Höfer.

Members

Members of the Metropolitan Region Hannover-Brunswick-Göttingen-Wolfsburg are:

Celle (district)
Gifhorn (district)
Göttingen (district)
Goslar (district)
Hamelin-Pyrmont (district)
Hildesheim (district)
Holzminden (district)
Nienburg (district)
Northeim (district)
Osterode (district)
Peine (district)
Schaumburg (district)
Soltau-Fallingbostel (district)
City Alfeld
City Bad Pyrmont
City Braunschweig
City Celle
City Einbeck
City Garbsen
City Göttingen
City Hann. Münden
Landeshauptstadt Hannover
City Hildesheim
City Holzminden
City Laatzen
City Langenhagen
City Lehrte
Municipality Lengede
City Nienburg/Weser
City Northeim
Oberharz (Samtgemeinde)
City Osterode am Harz
City Pattensen
City Peine
City Salzgitter
City Sarstedt
City Seesen
City Stadthagen
City Walsrode
City Wolfenbüttel
City Wolfsburg
Hanover (district)
Zweckverband Großraum Braunschweig
Expo-Region, Hameln

See also

Metropolitan regions in Germany

References

External links
Homepage der Metropolregion Hannover-Braunschweig-Göttingen-Wolfsburg
Raum Hannover - Braunschweig - Göttingen auf dem Weg zur Metropolregion - PDF der Region Hannover
Information der Stadt Braunschweig über die Gründung der Metropolregion

Metropolitan areas of Germany
Braunschweig
Hanover
Göttingen
Wolfenbüttel
Geography of Lower Saxony